Kalna Maharaja's High School is one of the oldest school in erstwhile Burdwan district. It is situated at Kalna, Purba Bardhaman district in the Indian state of West Bengal. The School is affiliated to West Bengal Board of Secondary Education, West Bengal Council of Higher Secondary Education and recognised by School Education Department, West Bengal.

History
At first, the school was established in Kalna beside the Ganga river by Pandit Tarakanta Bhattacharya with the consultation of Ishwar Chandra Vidyasagar and his friend educationist Taranath Bachaspati. In 1868 the school was officially started in the present premises by the help of Bardhaman Raj Mahtab Chand Bahadur.

See also
Education in India
List of schools in India
Education in West Bengal

References

External links
 

High schools and secondary schools in West Bengal
Schools in Purba Bardhaman district
Educational institutions established in 1868
1868 establishments in India
Schools in Colonial India